Brenhinoedd y Saeson (English: The Kings of the English) is the medieval title of three Middle Welsh annalistic chronicles known from three 14th-century manuscripts (referred to as P, R, and S) recording events from 682 to the English conquest of Wales in 1282 (P was subsequently continued to 1332, S ultimately to 1461). The title Brenhinoedd y Saeson is found only in the rubric to the earlier of the two surviving manuscripts of version S: the other two texts are commonly known as Brut y Tywysogion, but this title is found only in manuscripts of the late 16th century and cannot be considered authentic.

The three versions of Brenhinoedd y Saeson are closely related to and are probably translations from a text or texts evidenced by those Cambro-Latin annalistic chronicles now known as Annales Cambriae.

Sources
P survives in a single medieval manuscript: Aberystwyth, National Library of Wales, MS. Peniarth 20, written c.1330, probably at the Cistercian abbey of Valle Crucis (Llanegwestl). The scribe of this manuscript also wrote the earlier of the two manuscripts containing S.

R survives in four medieval manuscripts:
 Aberystwyth, National Library of Wales, MS. 3035B (Mostyn 116);
 Aberystwyth, National Library of Wales, MS. Peniarth 18;
 Aberystwyth, National Library of Wales, MS. Peniarth 19;
 Oxford, Jesus College, MS. 111 (Llyfr Coch Hergest, 'The Red Book of Hergest').
These all date from about 1350 to about 1400.

S survives in two medieval manuscripts:
 London, British Library, Cotton MS Cleopatra B V, written at Valle Crucis Abbey soon after 1332;
 Aberystwyth, National Library of Wales, MS. 7006D (Llyfr Du Basing, 'The Black Book of Basingwerk'), written in or soon after 1461 (where the chronicle ends). The principal scribe was the poet Gutun Owain, who died c. 1500, and whose datable manuscript output lies between 1456 and 1497.

Dating
P is datable 1286 – c.1330; R is datable 1307 – 1350; S is datable c. 1200 (probably 1282 or 1286) – 1300. The order of composition of the three versions remains to be determined.

Bibliography
 Dumville, D.N. 2005 Brenhinoedd y Saeson, 'The Kings of the English', A.D. 682–954: Texts P, R, S in Parallel. University of Aberdeen.
 Jones, T. 1953 Brut y Tywysogion. Darlith Agoriadol. Cardiff.
 Jones, T. 1941 Brut y Tywysogyon. Peniarth MS. 20. Cardiff.
 Jones, T. 1952 Brut y Tywysogyon ... Peniarth MS. 20 Version. Cardiff.
 Jones, T. 1955, 2nd edn, 1973 Brut y Tywysogyon ... Red Book of Hergest Version. Cardiff.
 Jones, T. 1971, Brenhinedd y Saesson ... British Museum Cotton MS Cleopatra B.5.. Cardiff.
 Lloyd, J.E. 1928 'The Welsh chronicles', Proceedings of the British Academy 14 pp. 369–91.
 Parry, John Jay (ed. & transl.) 1937 Brut y Brenhinedd. Cotton Cleopatra Version. Cambridge, MA.
 Roberts, Brynley F. (ed.) 1971 Brut y Brenhinedd, Llanstephan MS. 1 Version, Selections. Dublin.

External links
Brenhinedd y Saesson at Welsh Chronicles Research Group

1330 books
Medieval Welsh literature
Welsh chronicles
14th-century history books